is a side-scrolling hack-and-slash game developed and released by Taito as an arcade video game in 1985. It was ported to the Amstrad CPC, Commodore 64, Nintendo Entertainment System, MSX, Sharp X1, and ZX Spectrum.

Plot
The player takes the role of a young Iga ninja named Kage ("Shadow"), on a mission to rescue Princess Kiri (hime) - the Shogun's daughter - from the villainous warlord Yoshi (ro Kuyigusa) and fellow evil samurai Yuki (nosuke Riko). Kage must fight his way through a forest, along a secret passageway, up a fortress wall, and through a castle, rescuing her twice (three times in the FC/NES version) in order to win the game. Each time the princess is rescued, the seasons change from summer to fall to winter and back to summer.

Cast of characters
 Kage (Iga Ninja)
 Kirihime (Princess)
 Shinobi (Red or Blue Fuuma Ninja)
 Yobo (Red or Blue Magic Monk)
 Yukinosuke Riko (Samurai)
 Yoshiro Kuyigusa (Warlord)

Gameplay

The player is armed with a kodachi shortsword and an unlimited number of shuriken. Main gameplay revolves around killing enemy ninja (blue and red) and enemy fire-breathing monks over five stages:

The first stage is a horizontal and vertically scrolling forest, with the player able to jump quite high (more than a screen height), and able to grab/scale trees that are several screen heights. Grabbing a book causes Kage to stand still and meditate for several seconds while approaching enemies drop to the ground dead during a lightning storm.
The second stage is horizontally scrolling at the water's edge. The lower half of the screen is underwater, where ninja (blue and red) appear with breathing tubes. The player must kill ten ninja to advance. The player can jump into the water section, but mobility is severely hampered.
The third stage is another bi-scrolling stage. The player must jump continuously to reach the temple at the top.
The fourth stage is the temple. The player goes up the four sets of stairs, avoiding or killing enemy ninja and monks, to rescue Princess Kiri.
The fifth stage is a boss stage. It starts at the top of the temple, and then Kage and Kiri jump off the temple back to the forest, where Kiri is re-kidnapped by the boss. The player must kill the boss.

In home versions, grabbing a crystal ball causes the player's clothes to change to the next level in color and thereby attain certain powers (bigger shuriken or faster speed). If Kage is hit in a home version while in green or orange clothes, he does not die but reverts to his normal red clothes.

Cycles repeat after five levels are completed, and play continues until all lives are gone, which ends the game.

Reception
Game Machine of Japan listed The Legend of Kage on their November 15, 1985 issue as being the most-successful table arcade unit of the month. The Commodore 64 port received a mixed review from Commodore User magazine, criticizing the graphics, sound, controls and price, scoring it 5 out of 10. The magazine also said Legend of Kage was heavily influenced by Konami's beat 'em up game Shao-lin's Road, released earlier the same year. The NES/Famicom port of the game received negative feedback.

Legacy

Re-releases

The Famicom/NES version was re-released on the Wii Virtual Console in Japan on December 19, 2006, and in the United States on February 19, 2007. It was also released for the 3DS Virtual Console and Wii U Virtual Console in Japan. The arcade version also appears in the compilation title Taito Legends 2.

A 3D graphics remake of the arcade game along with the original arcade version is included in the 2006 compilation Taito Legends Power Up for the PlayStation Portable. The game is still side-scrolling.

The Revised Legend of Kage was included in the Taito Nostalgia 1 release along with the original game. It features two new playable characters, Ayame and Ganin. Ayame is a ninja who can throw bombs similar to the red ninja in the game and has an unlimited supply of throwing knives. Ganin is a dog who can breathe fire similar to the monks in the game and can perform a spin attack that does not have much range but leaves him invulnerable for an instant and kills any enemy that touches him. There is also a new final boss that all the characters face which is a giant green cobra that slithers on the ground back and forth on the screen at the end of each second run through the levels. It is the only enemy that does not jump into the air.

Sequel

A follow-up game was developed by Lancarse for the Nintendo DS, and published by Taito in 2008. Taito's parent company, Square Enix, published a North American localization of the game later that year.

See also
Ninja Hayate (Taito, 1984) follows a young ninja (who even looks like Kage) attempting to rescue a kidnapped princess.
Demon Sword (Taito, 1989) has similar gameplay to The Legend of Kage.

References

External links

The Legend of Kage NES instruction manual

1985 video games
Arcade video games
Amstrad CPC games
Commodore 64 games
MSX games
Nintendo Entertainment System games
Nintendo Switch games
PlayStation 4 games
Video games about ninja
Platform games
Sharp X1 games
Square Enix franchises
Video games about samurai
Video games scored by Fred Gray
Video games scored by Hisayoshi Ogura
Video games set in feudal Japan
Virtual Console games
Virtual Console games for Wii U
ZX Spectrum games
Single-player video games
Taito arcade games
Video games developed in Japan
Hamster Corporation games